Lake Forest High School may refer to:
 Lake Forest High School (Illinois), Lake Forest, Lake County, Illinois
 Lake Forest High School (Delaware), near Felton in Kent County, Delaware